Kennedy's Theatre is a theater in downtown Cleveland, Ohio, part of the Playhouse Square. It is located in the basement under the center. It is mostly used for intimate performances as it can only fit about 50 comfortably. The space can be repurposed depending on the production.

References

Theatres in Cleveland
Historic district contributing properties in Ohio
National Register of Historic Places in Cleveland, Ohio
Theatres on the National Register of Historic Places in Ohio